The 1912 West Virginia gubernatorial election took place on November 5, 1912, to elect the governor of West Virginia.

Results

References

1912
gubernatorial
West Virginia
November 1912 events in the United States